Le Thoureil is a village and former commune in the Maine-et-Loire department in western France. On 1 January 2016, the commune was merged into the new commune of Gennes-Val-de-Loire, but retains its own delegated mayor. Other than the village of Thoureil itself, it contains, Bessé, Saint-Maur-sur-Loire and Bourgneuf.

See also
Communes of the Maine-et-Loire department

References

Thoureil